John Reid Brown was an Australian politician. He was a member of the Western Australian Legislative Council representing the North-East Province from his election on 22 May 1924 until his retirement in 1930. Brown was a member of the Labor Party.

References 

Members of the Western Australian Legislative Council
20th-century Australian politicians